A Winter Pilgrimage: Being an Account of Travels through Palestine, Italy, and the Island of Cyprus in 1900 is a non fiction book by H Rider Haggard.

Reception

References

External links
Complete book at Internet Archive

1901 non-fiction books
Works by H. Rider Haggard
British travel books
English non-fiction books